Loaded Deck is a greatest hits compilation of Ace Frehley's solo career released in 1997, after the widespread Kiss reunion tour. It includes some of Frehley's greatest hits such as "New York Groove", "Rock Soldiers", and a cover of The Move's "Do Ya".

Track listing

Notable tracks not included
Although Loaded Deck contains many of Frehley's hits over his career, there are some notable tracks not included. "New York Groove" is the only song on the album from Frehley's most successful solo album, Ace Frehley. "Shock Me" is the only song on the album from Frehley's tenure in Kiss.

References

External links

Ace Frehley compilation albums
Albums produced by John Regan
1998 compilation albums
Megaforce Records compilation albums